Dalda is a brand of vegetable oil (hydrogenated vegetable cooking oil) popular in South Asia.

History 
Dalda was actually the name of the Dutch company that imported vanaspati ghee into India in the 1930s as a cheap substitute for desi ghee or clarified butter, prepared from cow's milk.(https://www.business-standard.com/article/management/40-years-ago-and-now-how-dalda-built-and-lost-its-monopoly-115030501153_1.html ). In British India of those colonial days, desi ghee was considered an expensive product and not easily affordable for the common public. It was then used sparingly in Indian households. Hence the need existed for a cheaper and affordable substitute.

In 1931, Hindustan Vanaspati Manufacturing Company was incorporated to manufacture synthetic vanaspati ghee. Until the early 1930s, hydrogenated vegetable oil available in India was imported into the country by Hussein Dada and Hindustan Vanaspati Manufacturing Co (now called Hindustan Unilever Limited and Unilever Pakistan). Hindustan Vanaspati wanted to start manufacturing hydrogenated vegetable oil locally and hence a new category of hydrogenated oil under the new brand name Dalda was born. Until then, Hussein Dada had been selling his imported product under the name Dada Vanaspati. He was asked for his cooperation by Lever Brothers to let the company insert the letter 'L' from Lever Brothers into the new brand name to make it Dalda. He agreed to the name change. Dalda was introduced in 1937, becoming one of the longest-running brands in India and Pakistan. 

In 1939, The Dalda film was an advertisement created for the marketing campaign for a vanaspati (cooking fat) brand called Dalda. Lintas created the India's first multi-media advertising campaign. Hindustan Vanaspati's "Dalda" product came to be synonymous with the genre, to the extent that the main style of hydrogenated vegetable oil is commonly designated generically as "vanaspati ghee". In 2003, Unilever announced the strategic decision to sell of the Dalda brand in both India and Pakistan.

In India 
In 2003, Bunge Limited acquired the Dalda brand from Hindustan Unilever Limited for reportedly under Rs 100 crore. Then Bunge made Dalda an umbrella brand (brand repositioning) and started selling different types of refined oils (soyabean, sunflower, Palmolive, etc) based on geography.

In Pakistan 
On 30 March 2004, Unilever Pakistan accepted an offer of Rs. 1.33 billion for the sale of its Dalda brand and related business of edible oils and fats to the newly incorporated company Dalda Foods (Pvt.) Limited. This was a one-of-a-kind corporate transaction in Pakistan, in which a group of six senior Unilever executives formed a management group and successfully purchased the Dalda business from Unilever Pakistan. This was achieved under the banner of the newly formed company Dalda Foods (Pvt.) Limited with the support of key financial institutions and Pakistan's biggest edible oil importer Westbury Group. In 2017, Dalda Foods was getting ready to get on the Pakistan Stock Exchange.

See also
 Harvey Duncan Dalda film
 Margarine

References

External links
 Dalda foods website
 Dalda India
 Dalda Foods Pakistan
Indian cuisine
Cooking oils
Food and drink companies of Pakistan
Indian brands
Food and drink in India
Pakistani brands
Vegetable oils